Ferric-chelate reductase (NADPH) (ferric chelate reductase, iron chelate reductase, NADPH:Fe3+-EDTA reductase, NADPH-dependent ferric reductase, yqjH (gene)) is an enzyme with systematic name Fe(II):NADP+ oxidoreductase. This enzyme catalyses the following chemical reaction

 2 Fe(II) + 2 apo-siderophore + NADP+ + H+  2 Fe(III)-siderophore + NADPH

Ferric-chelate reductase contains FAD.

See also 
 Ferric-chelate reductase

References

External links 
 

EC 1.16.1